Cornerstone is a sculpture in Tanner Park, Southwark, London.

Construction and history

2013
Work started to gain interested from the public around Tanner Park through flyers for stone workshops and to generate interest in a potential future sculpture on the estate Whites Grounds Estate.

2019
Cornerstone was led by the stonemason artist Austin Emery in directing 100 public participants in stonecrafting workshops to create individual stoneblocks that would be assembled into a larger sculpture. 

Bone used in the creation of the sculpture was gathered from the River Thames. 

Funding was raised on Spacehive for £86,081 (2019)  along with funding coming from other partners like the Mayor of London that provide £50,000 (2019)  and Southwark Council £7,500 (2019)

Gallery

References

External links

 

London Borough of Southwark
Outdoor sculptures in London